Refinitiv Indices is a line of indices and index services from Refinitiv:
 Country and Region Indices
 "Alpha-creating" "Indices"
 Custom Indices
 Calculation Services

Country & Region Indices 
Refinitiv Country & Region Indices include 51 countries and 29 regions worldwide. The indices
are free-float market-capitalization weighted. Even though each index is
available in price return and total return variants, dividend series are not provided by Refinitiv. 
The earliest of Refinitiv Country Indices start as late as April 1999.

The full list of Country & Region Indices include:

Sector Indices 

Refinitiv Sector Indices are defined using The Refinitiv Business Classification (TRBC). Available globally, by region or by country, Sector Indices are available at each of 10 Economic Sectors, 25 Business Sectors, 52 Industry Groups and 125 Industries. Top level global sector indices are as follows:

 Refinitiv Global Energy Index
 Refinitiv Global Basic Materials Index
 Refinitiv Global Industrials Index
 Refinitiv Global Cyclicals Index
 Refinitiv Global Non-Cyclicals Index
 Refinitiv Global Financials Index
 Refinitiv Global Healthcare Index
 Refinitiv Global Technology Index
 Refinitiv Global Telecommunications Index
 Refinitiv Global Utilities Index

In total, Refinitiv provides 1000+ sector indices (Global, country or region).

Commodity Indices 
The Refinitiv family of commodity indices represents specific subsets of commodities. Our commodity indices are among our most popular and most tracked indices, including the “Refinitiv/CoreCommodity CRB Index” and the “Refinitiv Equal Weight commodity Index”.

"Alpha-creating Indices" 
Despite the fact that the term is an oxymoron, among Refinitiv’ products are something the company markets as "alpha-creating indices" and "optimal indices".

"Refinitiv Lipper Optimal Indices" include five, asset allocation-oriented "indices" that allegedly assess the trade-off between risk and return in diversified portfolios. The five "Target Risk Optimal Indices" are:
 Aggressive Growth
 Growth
 Moderate
 Conservative
 Very Conservative
These "indices" are "optimized" and according to the marketing department at Refinitiv "build on modern portfolio theory to depict the best investment outcome for various levels of risk". "Optimal Target Risk Indices" are used singly or in conjunction with other indices as benchmarks for individual investor portfolios, performance benchmarks for target risk, or as the basis for wealth management.

Custom Indices & Index calculation services 
Refinitiv also creates custom indices and provides calculation services for clients.

See also 
 Thomson Reuters Business Classification
 Refinitiv Equal Weight Commodity Index (old name: Continuous Commodity Index)
 Refinitiv/CoreCommodity CRB Index

External links
 Refinitiv Indices
 TRBC
 Refinitiv Lipper Optimal Indices

American stock market indices